Philippe Baptiste (born March 28, 1972) is a French engineer, academic and researcher. Baptiste is most well known as the president of the National Centre for Space Studies CNES in addition to his several books and scientific publications and communications in the field of  algorithms, combinatorial optimization, operational research and artificial intelligence.

Early life and education
Baptiste was born on March 28, 1972, in France. Baptise holds a PHD in computer science from the University of Technology of Compiègne additionally he is a civil engineering graduate from the Ecole des Mines engineering school in Nancy. Baptise also holds a Msc from the University of Strathclyde, Glasgow and holds a DEA postgraduate diploma from Sorbonne University and is a research director. Baptiste specialises in operational research and artificial intelligence(AI), combinatorial optimisation, and algorithms.

Career
In 1999 during his academic career, Baptiste was a researcher at the French National scientific research centre (CNRS), in addition to IBM's Watson Research Center during 2000 to 2001.

Furthermore, for more than ten years during 2001 to 2012 Baptiste was a lecturer at France's Ecole Polytechnique engineering school. During this time he published several books and around 150 scientific papers, and became the head of Ecole Polytechnique engineering school's information technology laboratory and is credited with creating the Institute of Information Sciences and Interactions prior to being appointed Associate Director General in 2014 of CNRS.

In 2016, Baptiste was appointed as Chief Scientific Officer and later in 2017 named Chief Technology Officer of oil, natural gas, and speciality chemicals company Total. Furthermore, Baptiste has aided in founding and developing a number of start-ups and followed several collaborations with digital, defence and aviation manufactures.

During May 2017 to 2019, Batiste was named chief of staff to French-based biochemist, academic administrator, and politician who served as Minister of Higher Education Frédérique Vidal. After which in 2019 Batiste was an advisor to the French prime Minister Édouard Philippe, During this time Batiste was in close connection with the space policy.

During 2020, Baptiste was appointed Partner and Director of American global management consulting firm Boston Consulting Group.

Recognition
During 1999, Batisete was awarded the Prix Robert Faure award by the French Operations Research & Decision Support Society(ROADEF), a non-profit society that aims to promote scientific fields of operations Research and Decision in France. The award is in tribute to Professor Robert Faure and available to younger researchers (under 36) who are members of ROADEF, and is awarded every 3 years.

In November 2000, Batiste was awarded the Cor Baayen Award for his PHD thesis in an ERCIM country which include: Cyprus, Poland, France, Germany, Austria, Greece, Italy, Norway, Portugal, The Netherlands, Finland and Sweden. Baptiste won this award fue to the quality of his PHD thesis and his previous publications and achievements up to the year 2000.

Publications

2010–2019

2018
Philippe Baptiste, Nicolas Bonifas: Redundant cumulative constraints to compute preemptive bounds. Discret. Appl. Math. 234: 168-177 (2018)

2017
Philippe Baptiste, Mikhail Y. Kovalyov, Yury L. Orlovich, Frank Werner, Igor E. Zverovich: Graphs with maximal induced matchings of the same size. Discret. Appl. Math. 216: 15-28 (2017)

2012
Philippe Baptiste, Jacques Carlier, Alexander V. Kononov, Maurice Queyranne, Sergey Sevastyanov, Maxim Sviridenko: Integer preemptive scheduling on parallel machines. Oper. Res. Lett. 40(6): 440-444 (2012)
Philippe Baptiste, Marek Chrobak, Christoph Dürr: Polynomial-time algorithms for minimum energy scheduling. ACM Trans. Algorithms 8(3): 26:1-26:29 (2012)

2011
Philippe Baptiste, Jacques Carlier, Alexander V. Kononov, Maurice Queyranne, Sergey Sevastyanov, Maxim Sviridenko: Properties of optimal schedules in preemptive shop scheduling. Discret. Appl. Math. 159(5): 272-280 (2011)

2010
Giacomo Nannicini, Philippe Baptiste, Gilles Barbier, Daniel Krob, Leo Liberti: Fast paths in large-scale dynamic road networks. Comput. Optim. Appl. 45(1): 143-158 (2010)
Philippe Baptiste:A note on scheduling identical coupled tasks in logarithmic time. Discret. Appl. Math. 158(5): 583-587 (2010)
Philippe Baptiste, Ruslan Sadykov: Time-indexed formulations for scheduling chains on a single machine: An application to airborne radars. Eur. J. Oper. Res. 203(2): 476-483 (2010)
Philippe Baptiste, Federico Della Croce, Andrea Grosso, Vincent T'kindt: Sequencing a single machine with due dates and deadlines: an ILP-based approach to solve very large instances. J. Sched. 13(1): 39-47 (2010)
Marek Chrobak, Philippe Baptiste, Christoph Dürr:Polynomial Time Algorithms for Minimum Energy Scheduling. Scheduling 2010

1999–2009

2009
J. Meng-Gérard, Philippe Chrétienne, Philippe Baptiste, Francis Sourd: On maximizing the profit of a satellite launcher: Selecting and scheduling tasks with time windows and setups. Discret. Appl. Math. 157(17): 3656-3664 (2009)
Philippe Baptiste, Graham Kendall, Alix Munier, Francis Sourd: Preface. J. Sched. 12(6): 563-564 (2009)
Philippe Baptiste: Constraint-Based Schedulers, Do They Really Work? CP 2009: 1 
Philippe Baptiste, Jacques Carlier, Alexander V. Kononov, Maurice Queyranne, Sergey Sevastyanov, Maxim Sviridenko: Integrality Property in Preemptive Parallel Machine Scheduling. CSR 2009: 38-46
Philippe Baptiste, Marek Chrobak, Christoph Dürr: Polynomial Time Algorithms for Minimum Energy Scheduling. CoRR abs/0908.3505 (2009)

2008
Philippe Baptiste, Marta Flamini, Francis Sourd: Lagrangian bounds for just-in-time job-shop scheduling. Comput. Oper. Res. 35(3): 906-915 (2008)
Antoine Jouglet, David Savourey, Jacques Carlier, Philippe Baptiste: Dominance-based heuristics for one-machine total cost scheduling problems. Eur. J. Oper. Res. 184(3): 879-899 (2008)
Konstantin Artiouchine, Philippe Baptiste, Christoph Dürr: Runway sequencing with holding patterns. Eur. J. Oper. Res. 189(3): 1254-1266 (2008)
Konstantin Artiouchine, Philippe Baptiste, Juliette Mattioli: The K King Problem, an Abstract Model for Computing Aircraft Landing Trajectories: On Modeling a Dynamic Hybrid System with Constraints. INFORMS J. Comput. 20(2): 222-233 (2008)
Giacomo Nannicini, Philippe Baptiste, Daniel Krob, Leo Liberti: Fast Computation of Point-to-Point Paths on Time-Dependent Road Networks. COCOA 2008: 225-234

2007
Konstantin Artiouchine, Philippe Baptiste: Arc-B-consistency of the Inter-distance Constraint. Constraints An Int. J. 12(1): 3-19 (2007)
Philippe Baptiste: Book review. Oper. Res. Lett. 35(1): 139-140 (2007)
Philippe Baptiste, Peter Brucker, Marek Chrobak, Christoph Dürr, Svetlana A. Kravchenko, Francis Sourd: The complexity of mean flow time scheduling problems with release times. J. Sched. 10(2): 139-146 (2007)
Giacomo Nannicini, Philippe Baptiste, Daniel Krob, Leo Liberti: Fast point-to-point shortest path queries on dynamic road networks with interfal data. CTW 2007: 115-118
Philippe Baptiste, Marek Chrobak, Christoph Dürr: Polynomial Time Algorithms for Minimum Energy Scheduling. ESA 2007: 136-150
Giacomo Nannicini, Philippe Baptiste, Gilles Barbier, Daniel Krob, Leo Liberti: Fast paths in large-scale dynamic road networks. CoRR abs/0704.1068 (2007)

2006
David Savourey, Philippe Baptiste, Antoine Jouglet: Lower bounds for parallel machines scheduling. RIVF 2006: 195-198
Philippe Baptiste: Scheduling unit tasks to minimize the number of idle periods: a polynomial time algorithm for offline dynamic power management. SODA 2006: 364-367
Philippe Baptiste, Philippe Laborie, Claude Le Pape, Wim Nuijten: Constraint-Based Scheduling and Planning. Handbook of Constraint Programming 2006: 761-799
Philippe Baptiste, Peter Brucker, Marek Chrobak, Christoph Dürr, Svetlana A. Kravchenko, Francis Sourd: The Complexity of Mean Flow Time Scheduling Problems with Release Times. CoRR abs/cs/0605078 (2006)

2005
Philippe Baptiste, Claude Le Pape: Scheduling a single machine to minimize a regular objective function under setup constraints. Discret. Optim. 2(1): 83-99 (2005)
Huy Trandac, Philippe Baptiste, Vu Duong: Airspace sectorization with constraints. RAIRO Oper. Res. 39(2): 105-122 (2005)
Konstantin Artiouchine, Philippe Baptiste:Inter-distance Constraint: An Extension of the All-Different Constraint for Scheduling Equal Length Jobs. CP 2005: 62-76

2004
Philippe Baptiste, Peter Brucker, Sigrid Knust, Vadim G. Timkovsky: Ten notes on equal-processing-time scheduling. 4OR 2(2): 111-127 (2004)
Philippe Baptiste, Jacques Carlier, Alix Munier, Andreas S. Schulz: Introduction. Ann. Oper. Res. 129(1-4): 17-19 (2004)
Philippe Baptiste, Jacques Carlier, Antoine Jouglet: A Branch-and-Bound procedure to minimize total tardiness on one machine with arbitrary release dates. Eur. J. Oper. Res. 158(3): 595-608(2004)
Philippe Baptiste, Vadim G. Timkovsky: Shortest path to nonpreemptive schedules of unit-time jobs on two identical parallel machines with minimum total completion time. Math. Methods Oper. Res. 60(1): 145-153 (2004)
Philippe Baptiste, Marek Chrobak, Christoph Dürr, Wojciech Jawor, Nodari Vakhania: Preemptive scheduling of equal-length jobs to maximize weighted throughput. Oper. Res. Lett. 32(3): 258-264 (2004)
Philippe Baptiste, Sophie Demassey: Tight LP bounds for resource constrained project scheduling. OR Spectr. 26(2): 251-262 (2004)
Dac-Huy Tran, Philippe Baptiste, Vu Duong: From Sets to Geometrical Sectors in the Airspace Sectorization Problem. RIVF 2004: 7-10
Philippe Baptiste, Peter Brucker: Scheduling Equal Processing Time Jobs. Handbook of Scheduling 2004
Antoine Jouglet, Philippe Baptiste, Jacques Carlier: Branch-and-Bound Algorithms for TotalWeighted Tardiness. Handbook of Scheduling 2004
Philippe Baptiste, Marek Chrobak, Christoph Dürr, Francis Sourd: Preemptive Multi-Machine Scheduling of Equal-Length Jobs to Minimize the Average Flow Time. CoRR abs/cs/0412094 (2004)

2003
Philippe Baptiste: A note on scheduling multiprocessor tasks with identical processing times. Comput. Oper. Res. 30(13): 2071-2078 (2003)
Philippe Baptiste, Laurent Péridy, Eric Pinson: A branch and bound to minimize the number of late jobs on a single machine with release time constraints. Eur. J. Oper. Res. 144(1): 1-11(2003)
Philippe Baptiste: On minimizing the weighted number of late jobs in unit execution time open-shops. Eur. J. Oper. Res. 149(2): 344-354 (2003)
Philippe Baptiste, Baruch Schieber: A Note on Scheduling Tall/Small Multiprocessor Tasks with Unit Processing Time to Minimize Maximum Tardiness. J. Sched. 6(4): 395-404 (2003)
Huy Trandac, Philippe Baptiste, Vu Duong: Airspace Sectorization By Constraint Programming. RIVF 2003: 49-58

2002
Philippe Baptiste: Résultats de complexité et programmation par contraintes pour l'ordonnancement. University of Technology of Compiègne, France, 2002
Antoine Jouglet, Philippe Baptiste, Jacques Carlier: Exact procedures for single machine total cost scheduling. SMC 2002: 4
Philippe Baptiste, Marek Chrobak, Christoph Dürr, Wojciech Jawor, Nodari Vakhania:Preemptive Scheduling of Equal-Length Jobs to Maximize Weighted Throughput. CoRR cs.DS/0209033 (2002)

2001
Philippe Baptiste, Vadim G. Timkovsky: On preemption redundancy in scheduling unit processing time jobs on two parallel machines. Oper. Res. Lett. 28(5): 205-212 (2001)
Philippe Baptiste, Antoine Jouglet: On Minimizing Total Tardiness in a Serial Batching Problem. RAIRO Oper. Res. 35(1): 107-115 (2001)
Philippe Baptiste, Vadim G. Timkovsky: On preemption redundancy in scheduling unit processing time jobs on two parallel machines. IPDPS 2001: 200

2000
Philippe Baptiste, Claude Le Pape: Constraint Propagation and Decomposition Techniques for Highly Disjunctive and Highly Cumulative Project Scheduling Problems. Constraints An Int. J. 5(1/2): 119-139 (2000)
Philippe Baptiste: Scheduling equal-length jobs on identical parallel machines. Discret. Appl. Math. 103(1-3): 21-32 (2000)
Philippe Baptiste: Batching identical jobs. Math. Methods Oper. Res. 52(3): 355-367 (2000)

1990–1999

1999
Philippe Baptiste, Claude Le Pape, Wim Nuijten: Satisfiability tests and time‐bound adjustmentsfor cumulative scheduling problems. Ann. Oper. Res. 92: 305-333 (1999)
Claude Le Pape, Philippe Baptiste: Heuristic Control of a Constraint-Based Algorithm for the Preemptive Job-Shop Scheduling Problem. J. Heuristics 5(3): 305-325 (1999)
Philippe Baptiste: An O(n4) algorithm for preemptive scheduling of a single machine to minimize the number of late jobs. Oper. Res. Lett. 24(4): 175-180 (1999)

1998
Claude Le Pape, Philippe Baptiste: Resource Constraints for Preemptive Job-shop Scheduling. Constraints An Int. J. 3(4): 263-287 (1998)
Philippe Baptiste, Claude Le Pape, Laurent Péridy: Global Constraints for Partial CSPs: A Case-Study of Resource and Due Date Constraints. CP 1998: 87-101

1997
Philippe Baptiste, Claude Le Pape: Constraint Propagation and Decomposition Techniques for Highly Disjunctive and Highly Cumulative Project Scheduling Problems. CP 1997: 375-389

1996
Claude Le Pape, Philippe Baptiste:Constraint Propagation Techniques for Disjunctive Scheduling: The Preemptive Case. ECAI 1996: 619-623

1995
Philippe Baptiste, Claude Le Pape: A Theoretical and Experimental Comparison of Constraint Propagation Techniques for Disjunctive Scheduling. IJCAI (1) 1995: 600-606

References

See also
European Space Agency
French space program
Space technology

French aerospace engineers
French engineers
CNES
1972 births
Living people
Place of birth missing (living people)